Laurence Rosenthal (born November 4, 1926) is an American composer, arranger, and conductor for theater, television, film, and the concert hall.

Biography
Born in Detroit, Michigan, Rosenthal attended the Eastman School of Music in Rochester, New York, where he studied piano and composition. He then studied in Paris with Nadia Boulanger. Among his best-known film scores are A Raisin in the Sun, The Miracle Worker, Becket, The Island of Dr. Moreau, Clash of the Titans, The Return of a Man Called Horse and Meetings with Remarkable Men.

Rosenthal's Broadway arranging credits include The Music Man and Donnybrook!. He composed for Sherry!, A Patriot for Me and Take Me Along (dance music only).

His daughter is the distinguished stem-cell scientist Nadia Rosenthal.

Filmography

Awards
Rosenthal has also been nominated for two Oscars and two Golden Globes.  He has won seven Emmy Awards and been nominated for an additional six more.

Academy Awards

|-
| 1964
| Becket
| Best Original Score
| 
|-
| 1972
| Man of La Mancha
| Best Song Score and Adaptation
|

Emmy Awards

|+ Primetime Emmys 
|-
| rowspan=2 | 1966
| rowspan=2 | Michelangelo: The Last Giant
| Individual Achievements in Music - Conducting
| 
|-
| Individual Achievements in Music - Individual Achievements in Music - Composition
| 
|-
| 1974
| Portrait: A Man Whose Name Was John
| Best Music Composition - For a Special Program
|  
|-
| 1982
| The Letter
| Outstanding Achievement in Music Composition for a Limited Series or a Special (Dramatic Underscore)
| 
|-
| 1983
| Who Will Love My Children?
| Outstanding Achievement in Music Composition for a Limited Series or a Special (Dramatic Underscore)
| 
|-
| 1986
| Peter the Great
| Outstanding Achievement in Music Composition for a Miniseries or a Special (Dramatic Underscore)
| 
|-
| 1987
| Anastasia: The Mystery of Anna
| Outstanding Achievement in Music Composition for a Miniseries or a Special (Dramatic Underscore)
| 
|-
| 1988
| The Bourne Identity
| Outstanding Achievement in Music Composition for a Miniseries or a Special (Dramatic Underscore)
| 
|-
| 1992
| The Young Indiana Jones Chronicles
| Outstanding Individual Achievement in Main Title Theme Music
| 
|-
| 1993
| The Young Indiana Jones Chronicles (For episode "Vienna, 1908")
| Outstanding Individual Achievement in Music Composition for a Series (Dramatic Underscore)
| 
|-
| 1994
| The Young Indiana Jones Chronicles (For episode "Ireland, 1916")
| Outstanding Individual Achievement in Music Composition for a Series (Dramatic Underscore)
| 
|-
| 1995
| The Adventures of Young Indiana Jones: Hollywood Follies
| Outstanding Achievement in Music Composition for a Miniseries or a Special (Dramatic Underscore)
| 
|-
| 1997
| The Adventures of Young Indiana Jones: Travels with Father
| Outstanding Achievement in Music Composition for a Miniseries or a Special (Dramatic Underscore)
| 
|-

Golden Globe Awards

|-
| 1964
| Becket
| Best Original Score
| 
|-
| 1972
| "Rain Falls Anywhere It Wants To" (from The African Elephant)
| Best Original Song
|

References

External links
 
 
 

Living people
1926 births
American male composers
21st-century American composers
Eastman School of Music alumni
Emmy Award winners
Musicians from Detroit
21st-century American male musicians
La-La Land Records artists

Students of George Gurdjieff